See also Naive set theory for the mathematical topic.

Naive Set Theory is a mathematics textbook by Paul Halmos providing an undergraduate introduction to set theory. Originally published by Van Nostrand in 1960, it was reprinted in the Springer-Verlag Undergraduate Texts in Mathematics series in 1974.

While the title states that it is naive, which is usually taken to mean without axioms, the book does introduce all the axioms of ZFC set theory (except the Axiom of Foundation), and gives correct and rigorous definitions for basic objects.  Where it differs from a "true" axiomatic set theory book is its character: there are no discussions of axiomatic minutiae, and there is next to nothing about advanced topics like large cardinals. Instead, it tries to be intelligible to someone who has never thought about set theory before.

Halmos later stated that it was the fastest book he wrote, taking about six months, and that the book "wrote itself".

Absence of the Axiom of Foundation
As noted above, the book omits the Axiom of Foundation (also known as the Axiom of Regularity).  Halmos repeatedly dances around the issue of whether or not a set can contain itself.
p. 1: "a set may also be an element of some other set" (emphasis added)
p. 3: "is  ∈  ever true?  It is certainly not true of any reasonable set that anyone has ever seen."
p. 6: " ∈  ... unlikely, but not obviously impossible"
But Halmos does let us prove that there are certain sets that cannot contain themselves.
p. 44: Halmos lets us prove that  ∉ .
p. 47: Halmos proves the lemma that "no natural number is a subset of any of its elements."  This lets us prove that no natural number can contain itself.  For if  ∈ , where  is a natural number, then  ⊂  ∈ , which contradicts the lemma.
By his choice of the symbol < instead of ≤, Halmos implies that the well ordering < is strict (pp. 55-56). This definition of < makes it impossible to have  ∈ , where  is an element of an ordinal number. That's because  ∈  means  < , which implies  ≠  (because < is strict), which is impossible.
p. 75: the above definition of an ordinal number also makes it impossible to have  ∈ , where  is an ordinal number.  That's because  ∈  implies  = s().  This gives us  ∈  = s() =  ∈   < }, which implies  < , which implies  ≠  (because < is strict), which is impossible.

Errata
p. 4, line 18: “Cain and Abel” should be “Seth, Cain and Abel”.
p. 30, line 10: "x onto y" should be "x into y".
p. 73, line 19: "for each z in X" should be "for each a in X".
p. 75, line 3: "if and only if x ∈ F(n)" should be "if and only if x = {b: S(n, b)}".

See also
List of publications in mathematics

Bibliography
Halmos, Paul, Naive Set Theory. Princeton, NJ: D. Van Nostrand Company, 1960. Reprinted by Springer-Verlag, New York, 1974.  (Springer-Verlag edition). Reprinted by Martino Fine Books, 2011.  (Paperback edition); 2017 Dover reprint

References

External links
 A list of textbooks on set theory compiled by the participants of the mathematics stack exchange
 Reviews:Naive Set Theory from Goodreads.

1960 non-fiction books
Mathematics textbooks
Springer Science+Business Media books
Set theory